111th may refer to:

111th Delaware General Assembly, a meeting of the legislative branch of the state government
111th Engineer Brigade (United States), a combat engineer brigade of the United States Army
111th Field Artillery Regiment (United States), a 155MM towed artillery unit with a General Support/Reinforcing mission
111th Fighter Escadrille (Poland) of the Polish Air Force, a fighter unit of the Polish Army
111th Fighter Wing, an Air National Guard fighter unit located at NAS Willow Grove, Pennsylvania
111th Indian Infantry Brigade, an Infantry formation of the Indian Army during World War II
111th Infantry Brigade (Pakistan), an infantry brigade of the Pakistan Army
111th Infantry Division (German Empire), a unit of the Imperial German Army in World War I
111th Infantry Regiment (United States), represented in the U.S. Army by 1st Battalion, 111th Infantry
111th Maneuver Enhancement Brigade (United States), an air defense artillery brigade of the United States Army
111th meridian east, a line of longitude 111° east of Greenwich
111th meridian west, a line of longitude 111° west of Greenwich
111th Ohio General Assembly, the legislative body of the state of Ohio in 1975 and 1976
111th Ohio Infantry, an infantry regiment in the Union Army during the American Civil War
111th Reconnaissance Squadron, an MQ-1 flying squadron attached to the 147th Operations Group, 147th Reconnaissance Wing
111th Regiment of Foot (1761), an infantry regiment of the British Army from 1761 to 1763
111th Regiment of Foot (Loyal Birmingham Volunteers), an infantry regiment of the British Army from 1794 to 1796
111th Space Operations Squadron, an Air National Guard space communications unit at Sky Harbor International Airport, Arizona
111th Street – Morgan Park (Metra), one of two Metra railroad stations in the Morgan Park neighborhood of Chicago, Illinois
111th Street (BMT Jamaica Line), a skip-stop station on the BMT Jamaica Line of the New York City Subway
111th Street (IND Fulton Street Line), a station on the IND Fulton Street Line of the New York City Subway
111th Street (IRT Flushing Line), a local station on the IRT Flushing Line of the New York City Subway
111th Street (IRT Second Avenue Line), a station on the demolished IRT Second Avenue Line
111th United States Congress, from January 3, 2009, until January 3, 2011

Other
 111 Squadron (disambiguation)
 111th Regiment (disambiguation)
 111th Division (disambiguation)

See also
111 (number)
111, the year 111 (CXI) of the Julian calendar